Morse Field at Harold Alfond Sports Stadium is a 10,000-seat multi-purpose stadium in Orono, Maine. The stadium opened as Alumni Field in 1947 and underwent extensive renovations from 1996 to 1998. It is home to the University of Maine Black Bears football team. The wood and steel grandstands, built in the 1940s, were condemned and demolished in 1996, replaced with the current east grandstand, along with a temporary structure on the west side, adjacent to Alfond Arena. The current west grandstand, lights, press and luxury levels, as well as concessions and restroom amenities were completed prior to the 1998 season. The stadium was rededicated to Harold Alfond, a longtime Maine booster, at Maine's first home night game on September 12, 1998, a 52–28 win over New Hampshire in the Battle for the Brice-Cowell Musket. The field is named for Phillip and Susan Morse, who donated the lights, original Astroturf and scoreboard. In the summer of 2008, new FieldTurf was installed to replace the old AstroTurf. In 2014, a  HD video-board replaced the matrix display installed in 1998, and a contemporary scoreboard was installed on the north end.

See also
 List of NCAA Division I FCS football stadiums

References

External links
  Maine Black Bears football

 

College football venues
American football venues in Maine
Maine Black Bears football
Buildings and structures at the University of Maine
Multi-purpose stadiums in the United States
Sports venues completed in 1998
1998 establishments in Maine
Sports venues in Penobscot County, Maine